Marco Campese (born 9 May 1980, in Grugliasco) is an Italian football midfielder who currently plays for A.S. Gualdo Calcio.

Appearances on Italian Series 

Serie A : 0 Apps

Serie C2 : 145 Apps, 10 Goals

Serie D : 32 Apps, 2 Goals

Eccellenza : 65 Apps, 5 Goals

Total : 242 Apps, 17 Goals

External links
http://www.gualdocalcio.it/squadra0910/campese.htm

Italian footballers
Living people
1980 births
Association football midfielders
A.S. Gualdo Casacastalda players
Forlì F.C. players
S.S. Teramo Calcio players
A.S.D. La Biellese players
People from Grugliasco